Langendorf has been part of the municipality of Elfershausen in the Lower Franconian district of Bad Kissingen since 1978. It is the mother parish for the surrounding villages.

Location 
The parish village (Pfarrdorf) of Langendorf is located on the Franconian Saale river, southwest of Elfershausen.

The B 287 federal road runs along the southern edge of Langendorf, leading north-east to Euerdorf and Bad Kissingen and south-west to Hammelburg. Shortly before Langendorf, it forms the Hammelburg 97 junction to the A 7 autobahn, which runs east of Langendorf in a north–south direction.

History 

Langendorf was first mentioned in a document in 772 as "Wintgraben" on the occasion of a donation of estates in Langendorf to the Fulda monastery.

In 1025 the first church was built in Langendorf.

In 1635, during the Thirty Years' War, Swedish troops burned down the entire village, destroying its church.

From 1825 to 1830, the Church of St. Vitus was built in its present form. In 1901, the church tower was raised to match the significantly enlarged church building.

In 1951, a large part of Langendorf's district was threatened with incorporation into the military training area. This was prevented by protests. In the 1960s the Autobahn A 7 was built.

On 1 May 1978, the previously independent municipality of Langendorf was incorporated into Elfershausen as part of the district reform in Bavaria.

Notable villagers 
 Johannes Petri (1441 – 1511); printer and publisher
 Adam Petri (1454 – 1527); printer, publisher and bookseller
 Johannes Petreius (c. 1497 – 1550); woodcarver and printer
 Jochen Partsch (b 29 April 1962); since 2011 Mayor of the city of Darmstadt
 Theodor Wieseler (18 January 1859 – 11 December 1924); entrepreneur

References

External links 
 Langendorf at www.elfershausen.de
 

Villages in Bavaria
Bad Kissingen (district)
Former municipalities in Bavaria
Franconian Saale basin